Damien MacKenzie (born 21 July 1980) is an Australian cricketer. He played in five first-class and ten List A matches for Queensland between 2001 and 2004.

See also
 List of Queensland first-class cricketers

References

External links
 

1980 births
Living people
Australian cricketers
Queensland cricketers
Cricketers from Brisbane